The 2014 Aircel Chennai Open was a 2014 ATP World Tour tennis tournament, played on outdoor hard courts. It was the 19th edition of the only ATP tournament taking place in India and took place at the SDAT Tennis Stadium in Chennai, India, from 30 December 2013 to 5 January 2014.

Points and prize money

Point distribution

Prize money 

* per team

Singles main-draw entrants

Seeds

1 Rankings as of 23 December 2013

Other entrants
The following players received wildcards into the singles main draw:
  Yuki Bhambri
  Kyle Edmund
  Jeevan Nedunchezhiyan

The following players received entry from the qualifying draw:
  Radu Albot
  Alexander Kudryavtsev
  Henri Laaksonen
  Ramkumar Ramanathan

Withdrawals
Before the tournament
  Janko Tipsarević (achillar tendon injury) → replaced by  Somdev Devvarman
  Jürgen Zopp (back injury) → replaced by  Aleksandr Nedovyesov
During the tournament
  Lu Yen-hsun (right thigh strain)

Retirements
  Fabio Fognini (left leg strain)
  Alexander Kudryavtsev (right groin injury)
  Vasek Pospisil (lower back strain)
  Julian Reister (sickness)
  Mikhail Youzhny (sickness)

ATP doubles main-draw entrants

Seeds

1 Rankings as of 23 December 2013

Other entrants
The following pairs received wildcards into the doubles main draw:
  Sriram Balaji /  Ramkumar Ramanathan
  Karen Khachanov /  Saketh Myneni

Withdrawals
During the tournament
  Fabio Fognini (left leg strain)

Retirements
  Yen-hsun Lu (right thigh strain)

Finals

Singles 

  Stanislas Wawrinka defeated  Édouard Roger-Vasselin, 7–5, 6–2

Doubles 

  Johan Brunström /  Frederik Nielsen defeated  Marin Draganja /  Mate Pavić, 6–2, 4–6, [10–7]

References

External links 
 

 
2014
2014 ATP World Tour
2014 in Indian tennis
December 2013 sports events in India
January 2014 sports events in India